Zaqiqah is a genus of flowering plants belonging to the family Poaceae.

Its native range is Eritrea to Somalia, Southwestern Arabian Peninsula.

Species:
 Zaqiqah mucronata (Forssk.) P.M.Peterson & Romasch.

References

Chloridoideae
Poaceae genera